The 1976 Braintree District Council election took place on 6 May 1976 to elect members of Braintree District Council in England. This was on the same day as other local elections.

Summary

Election result

|}

Ward results

Black Notley

 

 

No Independent candidate as previous (12.9%).

Bumpstead

Castle Headingham

 
 

 

No Independent candidate as previous (48.9%).

Coggeshall

Colne Engaine & Greenstead Green

Cressing

Earls Colne

 
 

 

No Conservative candidate as previous (35.7%).

Gosfield

 

 

No Independent candidate (Seymour) as previous (51.8%).

Halstead Holy Trinity

 
 

 

No Liberal candidate as previous (44.0%).

Halstead St. Andrew's

Hatfield Peverel

Kelvedon

No. 1 (Braintree: East)

 
 
 
 

 

No Liberal (24.7%) or Communist (5.0%) candidates as previous.

No. 2 (Braintree: West)

No. 3 (Bocking: North)

No. 4 (Bocking: South)

No. 7 (Witham: West)

 
 
 

 

No Independent (38.7%, 33.0%) or Liberal (10.9%) candidates as previous.

No. 8 (Witham: North)

 
 
 

 

No Indepenent candidates as previous (26.0%, 13.4%, 12.3%).

No. 9 (Witham: Rivenhall South)

No. 10 (Witham: Rivenhall South)

No. 11 (Witham: Central)

 
 

 

No Liberal candidate as previous (7.1%).

No. 12 (Witham: South)

 

 

No Independent candidate as previous (44.8%).

Panfield

Rayne

Sible Headingham

Stour Valley Central

Stour Valley North

Stour Valley South

 

 

No Independent (Nott, 47.5%) or Labour (4.5%) candidates as previous.

Terling

Three Fields

 
 

 

No Independent candidates as previous (31.5%, 30.5%, 20.6%, 14.4%).

Upper Colne

Yeldham

References

Braintree District Council elections
1976 English local elections
May 1976 events in the United Kingdom
1970s in Essex